Poșaga is a commune located in Alba County, Transylvania, Romania. It has a population of 1,383, and is composed of seven villages: Corțești, Incești (Jencsest), Lunca (Aranyoslonka), Orăști (Orest), Poșaga de Jos (the commune center; Alsópodsága), Poșaga de Sus (Felsőpodsága) and Săgagea (Szegázs).

It is located in the northern part of the county, on the border with Cluj County.

Leon Șușman, the leader of an armed anti-communist resistance group from the 1950s, died in Poșaga de Sus in a shootout with Securitate troops in July 1957.

References

Communes in Alba County
Localities in Transylvania